Lebedynske is a village in Mariupol Raion (district) in Donetsk Oblast of eastern Ukraine, at 127 km south from the centre of Donetsk city.

During the War in Donbass, that started in 2014, the village was taken under control of pro-Russian forces. Ukrainian forces drove pro-Russian troops out of the village on 10 February 2015.

Demographics
Native language as of the Ukrainian Census of 2001:
Ukrainian — 35.38%
Russian — 63.93%
Moldovan — 0.28%
Belarusian — 0.14%

References

External links
 Weather forecast for Lebedynske

Villages in Mariupol Raion